is a Japanese professional wrestler and martial artist. He is best known for his tenure with New Japan-Pro Wrestling (NJPW).

His career began with the Dramatic Dream Team (DDT) promotion in 2004 and over the next eleven years became a three-time KO-D Openweight Champion, five-time KO-D Tag Team Champion and a two-time KO-D 6-Man Tag Team Champion. Two of the KO-D Tag Team title reigns was with Kenny Omega as the Golden☆Lovers; their combined total of 351 days is still a DDT record.

In 2009, Ibushi started working for New Japan Pro-Wrestling and eventually signed with the promotion in 2013. In NJPW, Ibushi is a former NEVER Openweight Champion, three-time IWGP Junior Heavyweight Champion and a one-time IWGP Junior Heavyweight Tag Team Champion. He resigned from both DDT and NJPW in February 2016 and has performed in several different organizations as a freelancer, including both DDT and NJPW as well as WWE, where he participated in the 2016 Cruiserweight Classic tournament.

After continuing to perform as a freelancer for NJPW after 2016 (including as Tiger Mask W, the protagonist of the anime of the same name, from 2016 to 2017), he signed a new full-time contract with NJPW in early 2019, winning the IWGP Heavyweight Championship for the first and only time in his career in 2021 before unifying it with the IWGP Intercontinental Championship to become the inaugural IWGP World Heavyweight Champion later that year. Ibushi is also a former IWGP Tag Team Championship. Ibushi has also won several tournaments for NJPW, including the 2011 Best of the Super Juniors, the 2015 New Japan Cup and the 2019 and 2020 editions of the G1 Climax, being the only wrestler to have won all three tournaments. He is also one of only four wrestlers to win two consecutive G1 Climax tournaments alongside Masahiro Chono, Hiroyoshi Tenzan and Kazuchika Okada, as well as the only wrestler to reach the finals stage of four consecutive G1 Climax tournaments.

Professional wrestling career

Dramatic Dream Team / DDT Pro-Wrestling

Early career (2004–2009)
On July 1, 2004, Ibushi made his professional wrestling debut for Dramatic Dream Team (DDT), losing to Kudo. In 2005, Ibushi won his first championship, when he and Daichi Kakimoto defeated Darkside Hero! and Toru Owashi to win the KO-D Tag Team Championship. On June 25, 2006, he lost to Danshoku Dino in a match for the Championship and spent most of later 2006 competing in multiple tag team matches. In 2007 Ibushi's fortunes fared better and he began to win more matches, including defeating BxB Hulk at a co-promoted event held by DDT and Dragon Gate. Later in 2007, Ibushi defeated Madoka to win the vacant Independent World Junior Heavyweight Championship. In February 2008, Ibushi defeated Tanomusaku Toba to retain the Independent World Junior Heavyweight Championship and win the Ironman Heavymetalweight Championship. He would go on to lose the Ironman championship to Danshoku Dino. On July 20, 2008, Ibushi would defeat Kudo in the Next KO-D Openweight Championship One Day Tournament finals but would ultimately lose to the KO-D champion Dick Togo a month later.

Golden☆Lovers and departure (2009–2016)

Ibushi would start teaming up with Kenny Omega as the "Golden☆Lovers" and on January 24, 2009 they defeated Harashima and Toru Owashi to win the KO-D Tag Team Championship and lost them in May to Dick Togo and Taka Michinoku. In the summer of 2009, Ibushi won the first KO-D Openweight Championship Contendership Tournament and went on to win the KO-D Openweight Championship from Harashima. During his time as champion he also won the Ironman Heavymetalweight Championship and would lose the Openweight Championship to Shuji Ishikawa. After winning the Best of the Super Juniors in New Japan Pro-Wrestling (NJPW) his matches in DDT were mostly tag team matches with his partner Kenny Omega or matches involving IWGP Junior Heavyweight Tag Team Championship. Ibushi's fortunes in 2011 were better, he teamed up with Danshoki Dino to win the KO-D Tag Team Championship, however after dislocating his shoulder he vacated the title.

Ibushi made his return at a DDT event on May 4, 2012, losing to El Generico. On June 24, Ibushi defeated Yuji Hino to win DDT's KO-D Openweight Championship for the second time. On August 18, Ibushi defeated Kenny Omega in the main event of Budokan Peter Pan to retain the KO-D Openweight Championship. On September 30, Ibushi lost the title to El Generico. On October 3, Ibushi won the third annual DDT48 general election and, as a result, earned an immediate rematch with El Generico. Ibushi received his rematch on October 21, but was again defeated by El Generico. On May 26, Ibushi, Gota Ihashi and Kenny Omega defeated the Monster Army (Antonio Honda, Daisuke Sasaki and Yuji Hino) to win the KO-D 6-Man Tag Team Championship. Their reign lasted 28 days, before they lost the title back to the Monster Army, now represented by Honda, Hino and Hoshitango. On August 18 at DDT's annual Ryōgoku Peter Pan event, Ibushi faced New Japan representative and reigning IWGP Heavyweight Champion Kazuchika Okada in a losing effort in a special non-title match. On January 26, 2014, Ibushi and Kenny Omega defeated Yankii Nichokenju (Isami Kodaka and Yuko Miyamoto) and Konosuke Takeshita and Tetsuya Endo in a three-way match to win the KO-D Tag Team Championship. On April 12, Ibushi and Omega became double champions in DDT, when they teamed with Daisuke Sasaki to defeat Team Drift (Keisuke Ishii, Shigehiro Irie and Soma Takao) for the KO-D 6-Man Tag Team Championship. Their reign, however, lasted only 22 days, before they lost the title to Shuten-dōji (Kudo, Masa Takanashi and Yukio Sakaguchi) on May 4. On September 28, Ibushi and Omega lost the KO-D Tag Team Championship to Konosuke Takeshita and Tetsuya Endo. On February 15, 2015, Ibushi won the KO-D Openweight Championship for the third time, defeating Harashima. He lost the title back to Harashima on April 29. On August 23, Ibushi won the KO-D Tag Team Championship for the fifth time, when he and Daisuke Sasaki defeated Daisuke Sekimoto and Yuji Okabayashi for the title. They vacated the title on November 2, when Ibushi was sidelined indefinitely with a cervical disc herniation.

On February 21, 2016, Ibushi announced his resignation from DDT.

Independent circuit (2004–2010) 
Ibushi competed in Wrestling Marvelous Future teaming with Onryo and lost to Garuda and Masa Takanashi. He would go on to compete for NJPW and Big Japan Pro Wrestling for a few months. Ibushi teamed with Kudo to take on Kenta and Naomichi Marufuji in the first round of Differ Cup 2005 and lost. Ibushi would go on to become Hustle Kamen Orange for Hustle, teaming with Hustle Kamen Red and the rest of the Hustle Kamen stable. Ibushi went on to team up with Fuka to win his first accomplishment in professionally wrestling, Dragon Mixture Tournament, by defeating Shinjitsu Nohashi and Yoshitsune in the final.

It was announced on January 26, 2008, that Ibushi would be competing for Ring of Honor in the United States. On April 11, 2008, in Boston he made his debut in a match against Davey Richards, a match in which he was cheered as a winner despite losing. During his brief tour of ROH, he wrestled against Claudio Castagnoli and teamed with Austin Aries against The Briscoe Brothers only to come up on the losing end. His last appearance of his U.S. tour of ROH ended with a singles victory over El Generico. Ibushi competed for ROH during the promotion's second tour of Japan, teaming with Kenta against Naomichi Marufuji and Katsuhiko Nakajima in a tag team match. It was announced on April 6, 2008, that Ibushi would be competing for Pro Wrestling Guerrilla in Burbank, CA. However, Ibushi would end up injured before his scheduled appearance, and was forced to miss the PWG event. On March 27, 2009, Ibushi made his debut for Philadelphia-based Chikara at the promotions annual King of Trios tournament where he formed a team with Kudo and Michael Nakazawa. After his team was eliminated in the first round by Equinox, Lince Dorado and Helios, he went on to wrestle in the Rey de Voladores tournament over the next two days. On March 29, Ibushi defeated Player Dos to win the tournament and become the 2009 Rey de Voladores.

On January 16, 2010, Ibushi participated in Evolve's first show, losing to Davey Richards in the main event.

Dragondoor and El Dorado Wrestling (2005–2008) 
Ibushi made his debut in Dragondoor on its debut show on July 19, 2005, taking part in Taiji Ishimori's babyface team along with Milanito Collection a.t. and Little Dragon. They were pitted in a handicap match against Aagan Iisou (Shuji Kondo, Takuya Sugawara and Yasshi), but they were defeated. Ibushi then teamed up with Ishimori to take part in the Aquamarine Cup tag tournament, beating at the first round a team of Aagan Iisou (Toru Owashi and Shogo Takagi) but being eliminated at the second by another (Kondo and Yasshi). After wrestling in the short-lived promotion for some months, Ibushi did a special apparition in its last show, figuring as a new member of Italian Connection (Milano Collection A.T. and Berlinetta Boxer) under the name of "Ibushino", in parody to Yossino, to defeat Aagan Iisou.

After Dragondoor folded, Ibushi was revealed as a part of its new incarnation, El Dorado Wrestling. He wrestled in El Dorado debut show on April 24, 2006, teaming with Ishimori and Jumping Kid Okimoto in a losing effort against Aagan Iisou and their new member Pineapple Hanai, later known as Ken45º. He got his revenge in El Dorado's first big show, teaming up with El Blazer and Milanito Collection a.t. to defeat Kondo, Yasshi and Ken45º after a miscommunication among those. In late 2006, Ibushi teamed with Milano Collection AT to take part in Treasure Hunters Tag Tournament and reached the finals before being knocked out by Dick Togo and Shuji Kondo. Ibushi and Kagetora won a number one condership match for the UWA World Tag Team Championship and went on to win the championships by defeating Tokyo Gurentai (Mazada and Nosawa Rongai) and would later vacate the championships due to inactivity. Ibushi gained a total of four points in Greatest Golden League 2008 which was not enough to progress out of block A and to the semi final.

New Japan Pro-Wrestling

IWGP Junior Heavyweight Champion (2009–2014)
In May and June 2009 Ibushi participated in the Best of the Super Juniors Tournament held by NJPW. Ibushi fought the likes of Koji Kanemoto, Taichi Ishikari and Jushin Thunder Liger, before losing in the semi-finals to Prince Devitt. Ibushi was a participant in Pro Wrestling Noah's NTV Cup with tag team partner Atsushi Aoki and advanced to the finals before losing to Yoshinobu Kanemaru and Kotaro Suzuki.

On June 1, 2010, Ibushi entered his second Best of the Super Juniors tournament. After winning his block with six victories out of seven matches, Ibushi defeated Ryusuke Taguchi to advance to the semifinals of the tournament, where he was once again defeated by Prince Devitt. On October 11, 2010, Ibushi returned to New Japan at Destruction '10 and teamed with his regular DDT partner Kenny Omega to defeat Apollo 55 (Prince Devitt and Ryusuke Taguchi) for the IWGP Junior Heavyweight Tag Team Championship, after Ibushi pinned Devitt. As a result of the pinfall victory, Ibushi was granted a shot at Devitt's IWGP Junior Heavyweight Championship at New Japan's biggest event of the year, Wrestle Kingdom V in Tokyo Dome on January 4, 2011. At the event Ibushi was unsuccessful in his attempt to win the title. On January 23 at Fantastica Mania 2011, a New Japan and Consejo Mundial de Lucha Libre co–promoted event in Tokyo, Ibushi and Omega lost the IWGP Junior Heavyweight Tag Team Championship back to Devitt and Taguchi. On May 26, Ibushi entered New Japan's 2011 Best of the Super Juniors tournament. After losing his first two-round robin stage matches, Ibushi came back with a six match win streak to finish first in his block and advance to the semifinals of the tournament. On June 10, Ibushi first defeated Davey Richards in the semifinals and then Ryusuke Taguchi in the finals to win the 2011 Best of the Super Juniors tournament and earn a shot at Prince Devitt's IWGP Junior Heavyweight Championship. On June 18 at Dominion 6.18, Ibushi defeated Prince Devitt to win the IWGP Junior Heavyweight Championship for the first time. Ibushi made his first defense of the title on July 24, defeating Devitt in a rematch at Ryōgoku Peter Pan 2011, and his second on August 1, defeating Devitt's tag team partner Ryusuke Taguchi. Ibushi then attempted to repeat Devitt's feat of holding both of New Japan's Junior Heavyweight Championships simultaneously, but on August 14, the Golden☆Lovers failed in their attempt to regain the IWGP Junior Heavyweight Tag Team Championship from Apollo 55. On September 12, Ibushi was stripped of both the IWGP Junior Heavyweight Championship and the KO-D Tag Team Championship, after he was sidelined with a dislocated left shoulder.

Ibushi returned to New Japan on June 16 at Dominion 6.16, when he, Daisuke Sasaki and Kenny Omega defeated Bushi, Kushida and Prince Devitt in a six-man tag team match. Later in the event, Ibushi challenged Low Ki to a match for the IWGP Junior Heavyweight Championship. On July 29, Ibushi defeated Low Ki to also win the IWGP Junior Heavyweight Championship for the second time. Ibushi made his first successful title defense on September 7, defeating Kushida. Ibushi followed up by also successfully defending the title against Ryusuke Taguchi on September 23 at Destruction. On October 8 at King of Pro-Wrestling, Ibushi lost the title back to Low Ki. On January 4, 2013, at Wrestle Kingdom 7 in Tokyo Dome, Ibushi unsuccessfully challenged Prince Devitt for the IWGP Junior Heavyweight Championship in a three-way match, which also included Low Ki. On July 5, Ibushi was announced as a surprise participant in the 2013 G1 Climax. Ibushi finished the tournament with four wins and five losses, failing to advance from his block.

On October 7, 2013, Ibushi, along with Naoki Sugabayashi and Sanshiro Takagi, representatives of both DDT and New Japan, held a press conference to announce that he had signed a dual contract with both promotions; three years with DDT and one year with New Japan, making him the first wrestler to have such a contract and officially have two home promotions. Ibushi wrestled his first match under a New Japan contract on October 14 at King of Pro-Wrestling, where he, Togi Makabe and Tomoaki Honma were defeated in a six-man tag team match by Bullet Club (Prince Devitt, Bad Luck Fale and Karl Anderson). Returning to the junior heavyweight division, Ibushi then began chasing Devitt for the IWGP Junior Heavyweight Championship. On January 4, 2014, at Wrestle Kingdom 8 in Tokyo Dome, Ibushi defeated Devitt to win the IWGP Junior Heavyweight Championship for the third time. Ibushi made his first successful title defense against El Desperado on February 11 at The New Beginning in Osaka. On March 6, Ibushi main evented New Japan's 42nd anniversary event, losing to Kazuchika Okada in the annual non-title match between the IWGP Junior Heavyweight and IWGP Heavyweight champions. On April 3, Ibushi made his second successful defense of the IWGP Junior Heavyweight Championship against Nick Jackson. Three days later at Invasion Attack 2014, Ibushi and El Desperado unsuccessfully challenged Nick and his brother Matt, The Young Bucks, for the IWGP Junior Heavyweight Tag Team Championship. Ibushi's third defense of the IWGP Junior Heavyweight Championship took place on May 3 at Wrestling Dontaku 2014, where he defeated Ryusuke Taguchi. On May 25 at Back to the Yokohama Arena, Ibushi unsuccessfully challenged Tomohiro Ishii for the NEVER Openweight Championship. On June 21 at Dominion 6.21, Ibushi successfully defended the IWGP Junior Heavyweight Championship against the winner of the 2014 Best of the Super Juniors, Ricochet. On July 4, Ibushi lost the title to Kushida in his fifth defense. During the match, Ibushi suffered a concussion, which forced him to pull out of the 2014 G1 Climax.

Heavyweight division (2014–2016)
On October 3, it was announced that Ibushi, now billed as a permanent heavyweight wrestler, had signed a one-year extension to his NJPW contract.
Ibushi would make his return after the G1 and at Power Struggle on November 8, attacked Shinsuke Nakamura after his match, issuing a challenge for the IWGP Intercontinental Championship. Ibushi received his shot at the title on January 4, 2015, at Wrestle Kingdom 9 in Tokyo Dome, but was defeated by Nakamura. On March 5, Ibushi entered the 2015 New Japan Cup, defeating IWGP Tag Team Champion Doc Gallows in his first round match. After defeating Toru Yano in the second round on March 8, Ibushi first defeated Tetsuya Naito in the semifinals and then Hirooki Goto in the finals on March 15 to win the tournament and earn the right to challenge for the singles heavyweight title of his choosing. Following the final match, Ibushi announced he had decided to challenge A.J. Styles for the IWGP Heavyweight Championship. The match took place on April 5 at Invasion Attack 2015 and saw Styles retain his title. From July 20 to August 14, Ibushi took part in the 2015 G1 Climax. He failed to advance from his block with a record of four wins and five losses, scoring big wins over former IWGP Heavyweight Champion A.J. Styles and reigning NEVER Openweight Champion Togi Makabe. As a result, Ibushi received a shot at the NEVER Openweight Championship on September 23 at Destruction in Okayama, but was defeated by Makabe. On November 2, NJPW announced that Ibushi was sidelined indefinitely due to cervical disc herniation. In February 2016, Ibushi announced his resignation from NJPW.

Return to the independent circuit (2016–2018) 
On February 21, 2016, Ibushi announced that while he had been cleared to return to the ring from his herniated cervical disc, he had decided to resign from both DDT and NJPW and continue his career as a freelancer due to feeling he could not handle the burden of working two schedules. As a freelancer, he is billed as a representative of Ibushi Puroresu Kenkyujo ("Ibushi Pro Wrestling Research Institute"). He wrestled his return match and his first match as a freelancer at DDT's 19th anniversary event on March 21, where he and Gota Ihashi defeated Jun Kasai and Sanshiro Takagi, and Kenso and Michael Nakazawa in a three-way tag team match. In April, Ibushi returned to the United States to take part in events held by Evolve and Kaiju Big Battel, while also appearing in the audience at WWE's NXT TakeOver: Dallas event. On May 29, Ibushi made his debut for Inoki Genome Federation (IGF), defeating Tanomusaku Toba. On August 11, Ibushi made his debut for Wrestle-1, defeating Jiro Kuroshio.

WWE (2016)
On June 13, 2016, Ibushi was announced as a participant in WWE's Cruiserweight Classic tournament. The tournament kicked off on June 23 with Ibushi defeating Sean Maluta in his first round match. On July 13, Ibushi made his NXT in-ring debut, defeating Buddy Murphy at the NXT tapings. The following day, Ibushi defeated Cedric Alexander in his second round match in the Cruiserweight Classic in a critically acclaimed match. On July 15, Pro Wrestling Torch reported that Ibushi had signed a developmental contract with WWE. In an interview published July 25, Ibushi admitted he had been offered a contract, but denied having signed it. On August 26, Ibushi defeated Brian Kendrick to advance to the semifinals of the Cruiserweight Classic. On September 14, Ibushi was eliminated from the tournament in the semifinals by eventual winner T. J. Perkins. Afterwards, Pro Wrestling Torch went back on their earlier report and stated that Ibushi had not agreed to a WWE contract beyond the tournament, which was a factor in him losing the semifinal match. On September 29, WWE announced that Ibushi would be teaming up with NXT's Hideo Itami in the upcoming Dusty Rhodes Tag Team Classic. When Itami was injured, Ibushi was paired up with T. J. Perkins. The two entered the tournament on October 13, defeating Lince Dorado and Mustafa Ali in their first round match. Later that same day, they were eliminated from the tournament in the second round by Sanity (Alexander Wolfe and Sawyer Fulton).

Return to NJPW

Tiger Mask W (2016–2017)
On October 10, 2016, Ibushi returned to NJPW, taking part in a dark match prior to the King of Pro-Wrestling event. Ibushi wrestled the match as the masked character "Tiger Mask W", based on the anime series of the same name, defeating Red Death Mask. The following day, NJPW announced that Tiger Mask W would return to the promotion in January 2017. Tiger Mask W returned on January 4, 2017, defeating Tiger the Dark at Wrestle Kingdom 11 in Tokyo Dome. On February 5, after successfully defending the IWGP Heavyweight Championship against Minoru Suzuki, Kazuchika Okada brought up Tiger Mask W as his next possible opponent, leading to a program between the two heading into NJPW's 45th anniversary show. On March 1, Tiger Mask W teamed with Tiger Mask to defeat Okada and Gedo in a tag team match. On March 6 at the 45th anniversary show, Tiger Mask W was defeated by Okada in a non-title main event.

Golden☆Lovers reunion (2017–2019)
On June 20, NJPW announced Ibushi, under his real name, as a participant in the 2017 G1 Climax. NJPW billed this as Ibushi's return to the company after two and a half years, not acknowledging his stint as Tiger Mask W. Ibushi finished the tournament on August 11 with a record of five wins and four losses, failing to advance from his block. On November 5 at Power Struggle, Ibushi unsuccessfully challenged Hiroshi Tanahashi for the IWGP Intercontinental Championship. On January 4, 2018, Ibushi defeated Cody at Wrestle Kingdom 12. It had been previously billed as a title match for Cody's ROH World Championship, but Cody lost it to Dalton Castle, before he had the chance to defend it at Wrestle Kingdom 12. At New Year Dash!! 2018, Ibushi was attacked by Cody after losing a match to Bullet Club, but leader Kenny Omega stopped him from doing so. At The New Beginning in Sapporo, Ibushi returned the favor, saving Omega, who was involved in an altercation with other Bullet Club members Cody and Hangman Page. In doing so, they reunited the Golden☆Lovers tag-team for the first time since 2014.

On night two of Honor Rising, the Golden☆Lovers won their return match as a team against Cody and Marty Scurll. After the match, Ibushi and Omega were confronted by the Young Bucks and challenged to a match at Strong Style Evolved on March 25. At the event, the Golden☆Lovers defeated the Young Bucks. Although Ibushi would later become a regular in Bullet Club tag matches during the Road to Wrestling Dontaku tour in April and May 2018, he was not considered a member of the faction. On June 9 at Dominion in Osaka-jo Hall, Ibushi was in Omega's corner, as he defeated Kazuchika Okada for the IWGP Heavyweight Championship. After the match, Ibushi, Omega and the Young Bucks all embraced in the ring, and formed a new sub-group called The Golden☆Elite.

Ibushi then participated in the 2018 G1 Climax, finishing with a record of 6 wins and 3 losses, tied for top of his block. He proceeded to the finals due to a victory in his final block match against IWGP Heavyweight Champion and Golden☆Lovers partner Kenny Omega. This would make Ibushi the first professional wrestler to proceed to the final of the New Japan Cup, Best of the Super Juniors and the G1 Climax. However, he lost the final to Hiroshi Tanahashi. On December 9, Ibushi defeated Hirooki Goto for the NEVER Openweight Championship, but lost it one month later against Will Ospreay at Wrestle Kingdom 13.

G1 Climax and final IWGP Heavyweight Champion (2019–2021) 
On February 11, 2019, Ibushi announced that he was staying in New Japan. He also said, that he will be first competitor in 2019 New Japan Cup. This came after speculation he was going to follow Omega to American promotion All Elite Wrestling. Since this announcement he has wrestled exclusively in NJPW. It was later revealed to be a two-year deal. In the first round of the New Japan Cup on March 10, he defeated Tetsuya Naito to advance to the next round but lose to Zack Sabre Jr in the second round. Due to defeating Naito, he was granted an IWGP Intercontinental Championship match against Naito at April 2019's G1 Supercard. Ibushi successfully defeated Naito and became the IWGP Intercontinental Champion for the first time in his career.

At Dominion 6.9 in Osaka-jo Hall, Ibushi lost the IWGP Intercontinental Championship back to Naito. Ibushi went on to compete in the 2019 G1 Climax winning the A block, finishing with 14 points, defeating Lance Archer, Bad Luck Fale, Will Ospreay, Zack Sabre Jr, Sanada, Hiroshi Tanahashi, and IWGP Heavyweight Champion Kazuchika Okada. His only two losses came to KENTA at G1 Climax in Dallas and to Evil.  He went on the defeat the winner of the B Block, Jay White, in the finals to win the tournament. This made Ibushi the first wrestler to win the G1 Climax, the New Japan Cup and the Best of the Super Jrs, the three main singles tournament in NJPW, in their career. He received his G1 Climax title shot on Night 1 of Wrestle Kingdom 14, where he was defeated by Okada for the IWGP Heavyweight Championship, before losing to White in a singles match on Night 2.

On February 21, 2020, on the New Japan Road event, Ibushi and Hiroshi Tanahashi, dubbing themselves Golden☆Ace, defeated the Guerrillas of Destiny to win the IWGP Tag Team Championship, Ibushi's first time winning the title and first tag team title win in NJPW since 2010. In June, Ibushi entered the New Japan Cup, where he defeated Zack Sabre Jr in the first round, before losing to Taichi in the second round. On July 12, at Dominion, Ibushi and Tanahashi lost their IWGP Tag Team Championships to Taichi and Zack Sabre Jr. On September 19, Ibushi entered G1 Climax 30, where he scored his first win in A Block against Kazuchika Okada. He only lost two matches during the whole tournament, against Shingo Takagi and the man he beat to win the previous year's G1, Jay White. On October 18, Ibushi won the tournament by defeating B Block winner, Sanada.

On November 7, 2020, at Power Struggle, Ibushi became the first man to unsuccessfully defend the Tokyo Dome IWGP Heavyweight and Intercontinental Championships challenge rights certificate, by losing the briefcase to White. Even though he had lost the right to challenge at the Tokyo Dome, Tetsuya Naito allowed him to challenge on the 4th of January, as Jay White had declared he'd be taking that night off.

On January 4, 2021, at Wrestle Kingdom 15, Ibushi pinned Tetsuya Naito in the main event to win the IWGP Heavyweight and Intercontinental Championships, becoming only the third man to win the IWGP Heavyweight and Junior Heavyweight Championships in history (the first two being Nobuhiko Takada and former Golden Lovers tag team partner Kenny Omega). He went on to successfully defend both titles against Jay White the following night on Wrestle Kingdom 15 Night 2. Ibushi would later declare his intentions to unify the IWGP Heavyweight and Intercontinental Championships.

Inaugural IWGP World Heavyweight Champion (2021–2023) 
After several months of Ibushi claiming that he wanted to unify his Heavyweight and Intercontinental titles into one, NJPW announced on March 1, 2021, that the championships would officially be unified into the new IWGP World Heavyweight Championship at the NJPW 49th Anniversary Show on March 4, with the winner of Ibushi's match against El Desperado for the Heavyweight and Intercontinental titles being crowned the inaugural champion; at the event, Ibushi won the match, making him the final IWGP Heavyweight Champion, the final IWGP Intercontinental Champion, and the inaugural IWGP World Heavyweight Champion. On April 4 at Sakura Genesis, Ibushi dropped the championship to 2021 New Japan Cup winner Will Ospreay in his first defense, ending his reign at 31 days. Ibushi would go on to make his fourth consecutive G1 Climax final, but would lose to Kazuchika Okada after suffering an arm injury, causing a referee stoppage. On February 1, 2023, Ibushi's contract with NJPW expired, rendering him a free agent.

Martial arts career 
Prior to the start of his professional wrestling career, Ibushi practiced karate, winning a shinkarate K-2 tournament in 2003. In 2006, Ibushi was planning on making his K-1 MAX debut, but it was cancelled after his opponent was injured. On November 11, 2014, Ibushi announced he would be making his shoot boxing debut in an exhibition match on November 30. The match with Ibushi's fellow DDT wrestler Michael Nakazawa ended in a draw.

Championships and accomplishments 
 CBS Sports
 NJPW Wrestler of the Year (2018)
 Chikara
 Rey de Voladores (2009)
 Dramatic Dream Team / DDT Pro-Wrestling
 IMGP World Heavyweight Championship (1 time)
 Independent World Junior Heavyweight Championship (1 time)
 Ironman Heavymetalweight Championship (3 times)
 KO-D 6-Man Tag Team Championship (2 times) – with Gota Ihashi and Kenny Omega (1), and Daisuke Sasaki and Kenny Omega (1)
 KO-D Openweight Championship (3 times)
 KO-D Tag Team Championship (5 times) – with Daichi Kakimoto (1), Kenny Omega (2), Danshoku Dino (1) and Daisuke Sasaki (1)
 Go-1 Climax (2014)
 KO-D Openweight Championship Contendership Tournament (2009)
KO-D Tag League (2005) – with Daichi Kakimoto
 DDT48/Dramatic Sousenkyo (2012, 2014)
 Best Match Award (2012) 
 El Dorado Wrestling
 UWA World Tag Team Championship (1 time) – with Kagetora
Inside The Ropes Magazine
 Ranked No. 6 of the top 50 wrestlers in the world in the ITR 50 in 2020.
 Japan Indie Awards
 Best Bout Award (2008) 
 Best Bout Award (2011) 
 Best Bout Award (2012) 
 Best Bout Award (2014) 
 MVP Award (2007, 2009)
 Kaientai Dojo
 Tag Team Best Bout K-Award (2007) 
 Kaiju Big Battel
 KBB Hashtag Championship (1 time)
 New Japan Pro-Wrestling
IWGP World Heavyweight Championship (1 time, inaugural)
IWGP Heavyweight Championship (1 time, final)
IWGP Intercontinental Championship (2 times, final)
 IWGP Junior Heavyweight Championship (3 times)
 IWGP Junior Heavyweight Tag Team Championship (1 time) – with Kenny Omega
IWGP Tag Team Championship (1 time) – with Hiroshi Tanahashi
NEVER Openweight Championship (1 time)
Best of the Super Juniors (2011)
G1 Climax (2019, 2020)
New Japan Cup (2015)
Concurso (2020)
 Nikkan Sports
 Best Tag Team Award (2010) 
 Technique Award (2009, 2010)
 Pro Wrestling Illustrated
 Ranked No. 5 of the top 500 singles wrestlers in the PWI 500 in 2021
 SoCal Uncensored
 Southern California Match of the Year (2018) 
 Sports Illustrated
 Ranked No 2. of the top 10 men's wrestlers in 2018 – 
 Ranked No. 8 of the top 10 wrestlers in 2020
 Tokyo Sports
 Best Bout Award (2010) 
 Best Bout Award (2013) 
 Technique Award (2009, 2019)
 Toryumon Mexico
 Young Dragons Cup (2006)
 Último Dragón Fiesta
 Dragon Mixture Tournament (2006) – with Daichi Kakimoto, Fuka and Seiya Morohashi
 Weekly Pro Wrestling
 Best Bout Award (2010) 
 Best Bout Award (2018) 
 Best Tag Team Award (2010) 
 Wrestling Observer Newsletter
 Best Flying Wrestler (2009, 2010, 2012, 2013)
 Pro Wrestling Match of the Year (2015) 
 Wrestling Observer Newsletter Hall of Fame (Class of 2022)

References

External links 

 DDT Pro-Wrestling profile
 Inoki Genome Federation profile
 
 
 WWE Cruiserweight Classic profile
 
 
 

 

1982 births
Japanese male karateka
Japanese male professional wrestlers
Living people
Sportspeople from Kagoshima Prefecture
Masked wrestlers
IWGP World Heavyweight champions
IWGP Heavyweight champions
IWGP Intercontinental champions
NEVER Openweight champions
IWGP Junior Heavyweight champions
IWGP Junior Heavyweight Tag Team Champions
IWGP Heavyweight Tag Team Champions
UWA World Tag Team Champions
Independent World Junior Heavyweight Champions
Ironman Heavymetalweight Champions
KO-D 6-Man Tag Team Champions
KO-D Tag Team Champions
KO-D Openweight Champions